The 2002 Conference USA baseball tournament was the 2002 postseason baseball championship of the NCAA Division I Conference USA, held at Grainger Stadium in Kinston, North Carolina, from May 21 through 26. East Carolina defeated Houston in the championship game, earning the conference's automatic bid to the 2002 NCAA Division I baseball tournament.

Regular season results 

 Records reflect conference play only.

Bracket 

 Bold indicates the winner of the game.
 Italics indicate that the team was eliminated from the tournament.

All-tournament team

References 

Tournament
Conference USA Baseball Tournament
Conference USA baseball tournament
Conference USA baseball tournament
Baseball in North Carolina
College sports in North Carolina
Sports competitions in North Carolina
Tourist attractions in Lenoir County, North Carolina